The 2021 Hull Kingston Rovers season was Hull Kingston Rovers 2021 season, in which they competed in Super League XXVI and the 2021 Challenge Cup. They were coached by Tony Smith.

League standings

2021 squad

References

External links 
 
 Hull KR Junior Robins
 Hull KR history

Hull Kingston Rovers seasons
Super League XXVI by club